Custer County is a rural mountain county in the center of the U.S. state of Idaho. As of the 2020 census, the population was 4,275. The county seat is Challis. Established in 1881, the county was named for the General Custer Mine, where gold was discovered five years earlier. Custer County relies on ranching, mining, and tourism as its main resources.

Geography
It is the third-largest county in Idaho by area.

The Lost River Range, the state's highest mountains, are located in eastern Custer County.

The Salmon River and Big Lost River flow through Custer County.

Adjacent counties
Lemhi County - north
Butte County - east
Blaine County - south
Elmore County - southwest
Boise County - southwest
Valley County - west

Major highways
 US 93

National protected areas
 Challis National Forest (part)
 Sawtooth National Forest (part)
 Sawtooth National Recreation Area (part)
 Hemingway–Boulders Wilderness (part)
 Jim McClure–Jerry Peak Wilderness
 Sawtooth Wilderness (part)
 Cecil D. Andrus–White Clouds Wilderness

Demographics

2000 census
As of the census of 2000, there were 4,342 people, 1,770 households, and 1,196 families living in the county. The population density was 0.88 people per square mile (0.34/km2). There were 2,983 housing units at an average density of 0.60 per square mile (0.23/km2). The racial makeup of the county was 97.28% White, 0.55% Native American, 0.02% Asian, 0.02% Pacific Islander, 1.17% from other races, and 0.94% from two or more races. 4.21% of the population were Hispanic or Latino of any race. 18.6% were of English, 17.0% German, 10.9% Irish and 9.9% American ancestry.

There were 1,770 households, out of which 29.90% had children under the age of 18 living with them, 60.10% were married couples living together, 4.40% had a female householder with no husband present, and 32.40% were non-families. 27.70% of all households were made up of individuals, and 11.30% had someone living alone who was 65 years of age or older. The average household size was 2.41 and the average family size was 2.96.

In the county, the population was spread out, with 25.50% under the age of 18, 4.80% from 18 to 24, 25.90% from 25 to 44, 29.30% from 45 to 64, and 14.50% who were 65 years of age or older. The median age was 41 years. For every 100 females there were 104.50 males. For every 100 females age 18 and over, there were 106.80 males.

The median income for a household in the county was $32,174, and the median income for a family was $39,551. Males had a median income of $32,255 versus $21,463 for females. The per capita income for the county was $15,783. About 10.70% of families and 14.30% of the population were below the poverty line, including 16.70% of those under age 18 and 12.80% of those age 65 or over.

2010 census
As of the 2010 United States Census, there were 4,368 people, 1,936 households, and 1,244 families living in the county. The racial makeup of the county was 96.4% white, 0.6% American Indian, 0.2% black or African American, 0.2% Asian, 0.1% Pacific islander, 1.5% from other races, and 1.0% from two or more races. Those of Hispanic or Latino origin made up 4.0% of the population. In terms of ancestry, 34.3% were English, 25.6% were German, 19.5% were Irish, and 2.8% were American.

Of the 1,936 households, 24.2% had children under the age of 18 living with them, 55.7% were married couples living together, 4.8% had a female householder with no husband present, 35.7% were non-families, and 30.2% of all households were made up of individuals. The average household size was 2.25 and the average family size was 2.74. The median age was 48.0 years.

The median income for a household in the county was $41,910 and the median income for a family was $56,710. Males had a median income of $42,865 versus $27,317 for females. The per capita income for the county was $22,625. About 10.1% of families and 13.8% of the population were below the poverty line, including 19.2% of those under age 18 and 13.2% of those age 65 or over.

Politics
Custer County is overwhelmingly Republican. The last Democrat to carry the county was John F. Kennedy in 1960, since 1968 no Democrat has passed 37 percent of the county's vote, and the last to pass 28 percent was Michael Dukakis in 1988. However, unusually for so Republican a county, the westernmost precincts adjacent to Blaine County give Democratic majorities in most statewide elections. In the 2008 Presidential election, it supported Republican John McCain over Democrat Barack Obama by a margin of 71 percent to 25 percent. In 2012, the county gave Mitt Romney a first ballot victory in the Republican primary caucus and subsequently voted 74.1 percent for him in the Presidential election. In 2016, Donald Trump won the Republican primaries with 41.8 percent of support in the county although Ted Cruz won the state with 45.5 percent.

Communities

Cities
Challis
Clayton
Lost River
Mackay
Stanley

Unincorporated communities
 Dickey
 Ellis 
 Goldburg

Ghost towns
 Bayhorse 
 Bonanza 
 Custer

See also
National Register of Historic Places listings in Custer County, Idaho

References

External links

Challis School District #181

Further reading
The History of Custer County

 

 
Idaho counties
1881 establishments in Idaho Territory
Populated places established in 1881